The Last Domino? – The Hits is a greatest hits album by the English rock band Genesis, released on 17 September 2021 by Virgin Records. The set coincides with The Last Domino? Tour, staged following the announcement of their reunion after a 13-year hiatus. It features songs originally released between Selling England by the Pound (1973) and We Can't Dance (1991).

Track listing
CD 1

CD 2

Personnel
Genesis
Tony Banks – keyboards, 12 string guitar 
Mike Rutherford – lead guitar (except below), bass guitar, 12 string guitar
Phil Collins – drums, lead vocals (except below)
Steve Hackett – guitar on "The Cinema Show", "The Lamb Lies Down on Broadway", "Firth of Fifth", "I Know What I Like (In Your Wardrobe)", "Dancing with the Moonlit Knight", "The Carpet Crawlers", "Afterglow"
Peter Gabriel – lead vocals, flute on "The Cinema Show", "The Lamb Lies Down on Broadway", "Firth of Fifth", "I Know What I Like (In Your Wardrobe)", "Dancing with the Moonlit Knight", "The Carpet Crawlers"

Charts

References

Genesis (band) compilation albums
2021 greatest hits albums
Virgin Records compilation albums